The siege of Trebinje was an Austro-Venetian attempt to take the city of Trebinje from the Ottoman forces.

Battle 
Austrian general Nastić tried to take Trebinje with 400 soldiers and  500 hajduks, but was repelled. A combined 7,000 strong Austro-Venetian-Hajduk army stood before the Trebinje walls, defended by only 1,000 Ottomans. The Ottomans were busy near Belgrade and with hajduk attacks towards Mostar, they were unable to reinforce Trebinje. The conquest of Trebinje and Popovo field were given up to fight in Montenegro. The Venetians took over Hutovo and Popovo, where they immediately recruited militarily from the population.

References

Sources

Austro-Turkish War (1716–1718)
Trebinje
Trebinje
Trebinje
1716 in Austria
1716 in the Ottoman Empire
Trebinje